The Klamath River begins below Upper Klamath Lake in Southern Oregon and flows about 300 miles through Northern California until draining into the Pacific ocean. Upper Klamath Lake is the largest freshwater lake in Oregon and was established by the late Pliocene period. The lake fills a graben that is thousands of meters deep. The Klamath Basin lies on the edge of the Basin and Range province and is adjacent to the High Cascades of Southern Oregon.

Human Settlement 
The Klamath River is the home of the Klamath Tribes, the Karuk Tribe, the Yurok Tribe, and Hoopa Tribe. The tribes use the Klamath river for fishing, basket weaving materials, and cultural purposes. Native Americans have lived along the Klamath river for over 10,000 years. The first Europeans arrived in the area in 1826. The first settlers arrived in 1859 and Fort Klamath was built in 1863. The railroad arrived in 1909 causing an economic boom. In 1850-1851 miners arrived during the gold rush and would dam and divert the Klamath river causing major distribution to the Native American tribes. Damming and diverting the water caused difficulty in salmon moving up the Klamath river to spawn, thus affecting the fish populations. Then in 1864 a treaty was signed for the Klamath Indian Reservation.

Fisheries 
The Klamath River is the third largest salmon and steelhead producing river on the West Coast. The river once produced about one million salmon. Populations have declined and are at levels that in some years do not support commercial harvest. The salmon in the Klamath river are used to regulate commercial salmon fishing in the Pacific ocean. If numbers are too low, commercial salmon fishing season is either delayed or closed. Salmon are a critical food source for the tribes along the river. The reasoning for these anadromous species suffering is due to dams blocking access to historic spawning areas and natural river flows being changed. Fish can access about 300–700 miles of spawning habitat upstream of Iron Gate Dam. Low flows released from the Bureau of Reclamation from Upper Klamath Lake impact water quality and result in high water temperature.  Operation of the Klamath Hydroelectric Project also alters water quality in the lower Klamath river. In 2002 low flows in the lower Klamath river resulted in the death of an estimated 30,000- 60,000 adult salmon, making it the largest salmon kill in the history of the Western United States. Fall and spring Chinook salmon populations have decreased dramatically since the early 1900s. The Coho salmon were also important to the Klamath river, especially for the tribes, and have since experience a 96% decline in population. Steelhead population have also decreased dramatically.

Both the Lost River and shortnose suckers live in Upper Klamath Lake, Lower Klamath Lake, and the Lost River. Both the Lost River suckers and the shortnose suckers were listed as endangered on the Federal Endangered Species Act.

Water Quality 
Water quality in the Klamath River is considered to be impaired. The Klamath River is on the U.S. Environmental Protection Agency Clean Water Act 303(d) list of impaired water bodies, as are Upper Klamath Lake, the Lost River, and Iron Gate and Copco Reservoirs. Bodies of water that do not meet the water quality standards are put onto the 303(d) list and are declared water quality impaired. When water is released from the dams on the Klamath during the fall the water is typically warmer that it was before the dams were built. This causes problems downstream for anadromous fish, especially salmon. The reservoirs also release water low in dissolved oxygen which harms the fish downstream. Dams release water from the low level outlet at the bottom of the reservoir which is low in oxygen. Releasing this deoxygenated water causes environmental issues downstream. Extremely high levels of blue-green algae (cyanobacteria) have been found in Iron Gate and Copco Reservoirs. This algae produces toxins harmful to fish, livestock, and humans. Large algae growth in Keno Reservoir during summer can cause the dissolved oxygen levels to from to very low levels causing large fish kills.

Water Supply 
The Klamath Project provides water to irrigate 200,000 acres in southern Oregon and northern California. The Bureau of Reclamation (BOR) began building the irrigation project in 1905. Water rights have been fought over in the basin for over the last 100 years. The BOR controls the operations of Link River Dam as well as Upper Klamath Lake. BOR balances water for species in the reservoirs, downstream of the reservoirs, wildlife refuges, and irrigation. In 2001 the BOR announces that there was not enough water for the Klamath Project due to the severity of the drought. Water was needed to protect these species along the Klamath Project. This causes the water to be shut off during the irrigation season causing hundreds of farmers to be out of water during the peak of irrigation.

Klamath Hydroelectric Project Relicensing 
In 2002, Pacificorp, filed a Notice of Intent (NOI) with the Federal Energy Regulatory Commission (FERC) to relicense the Klamath Hydroelectric Project (Project). Hydroelectric Projects are required to be relicensed every 30–50 years through the Federal Power Act. FERC has the authority over all non-federal hydroelectric dams. The Klamath Hydroelectric project being one of them. When a dam is up for relicensing it gives an opportunity to evaluate both environmental and public benefits of the hydroelectric project. Between 1903 and 1962, PacifiCorp built seven hydroelectric dams and one non-generating dam.

The hydroelectric releasing process requires an environmental review of the Project with input from state and federal agencies, tribes, non-governmental organizations and the local community interests. When relicensing a hydroelectric process one must determine how to balance the generation of an electric project while still being environmentally friendly.

When PacifiCorp began the relicensing process it was known that the Project had impacts on fisheries and water quality.  State and Federal agencies, tribes, and non-governmental organizations requested multiple studies to evaluate the impact of the Project on fish, water quality, and other environmental and cultural issues. Section 18 of the Federal Power Act says that FERC may require construction, maintenance, and operation by a licensee of fishways required by the National Marine Fisheries Service, which oversees the health of migrating fish such as salmon. The National Marine Fisheries Service requested the dams needed fish ladders. The California State Water Resources Control Board had authority under Section 401 of the Clean Water Act to issue conditions needed for the Project to meet water quality standards. As multiple agencies were requiring more work to be done to have the Project “environmentally friendly” PacifiCorp learned the cost would be $400 million. PacifiCorp did not believe meeting the Clean Water Act and Endangered Species Act at such price was cost effective. At this time the Klamath Hydroelectric Settlement Agreement (KHSA) was negotiated between 23 different parties to remove four dams on the Klamath River. These four dams include JC Boyle, Copco 1, Copco 2, and Iron Gate. As agreed to in the KHSA the non-profit Klamath River Renewal Corporation with representatives from California, Oregon, Tribes, and NGO’s is removing the dams. It is expected that the dams begin to be removed in 2020. Funding for dam removal will come from California Bonds and money collected from ratepayers in Oregon. This will result in the largest dam removal ever attempted in the United States.

References 

Waterboards.ca.gov. (2017). State Water Resources Control Board. [online] Available at: https://		www.waterboards.ca.gov/waterrights/water_issues/programs/water_quality_cert/			klamath_ferc2082.shtml [Accessed 19 Mar. 2019].

Removal, A. and Agreement, K. (2017). Klamath Hydroelectric Settlement Agreement. [online] 		Klamathrestoration.org. Available at: http://www.klamathrestoration.org/index.php/		klamath-hydroelectric-settlement-agreement [Accessed 21 Mar. 2019].

Www3.epa.gov. (2017). Watershed Priorities: Klamath | Region 9: Water | US EPA. [online] 		Available at: https://web.archive.org/web/20171208005252/https://www3.epa.gov/region9/water/watershed/klamath.html [Accessed 20 		Mar. 2019]

A River Never the Same A History of Water in the Klamath Basin. (1999). Klamath Falls, OR: Shaw Historical Library. 

Klamath River
Rivers of California
Rivers of Oregon